Idopterum is a genus of moths in the subfamily Arctiinae. The genus was erected by George Hampson in 1894.

Species
 Idopterum novaepommeraniae Strand, 1922
 Idopterum ovale Hampson, 1894

References

External links

Lithosiini
Moth genera